Andarvar (also Romanized as Āndarvar; also known as Andarood and Andarūd) is a village in Baladeh Kojur Rural District, in the Central District of Nowshahr County, Mazandaran Province, Iran. At the 2006 census, its population was 1,641, in 419 families.

References 

Populated places in Nowshahr County